Rubble Kings is a 2015 documentary film directed by Shan Nicholson that depicts gang violence in The Bronx in the 1970s, specifically the events leading up to and following the Hoe Avenue peace meeting.

The film premiered at the DOC NYC film festival in New York City on November 16, 2014.

One of the film's producers, actor Jim Carrey, stated the following during a Q&A session after the film's premiere:

The first time I saw the footage, I was completely blown away by this incredible thing that had happened, that no one knows about. A great movement towards peace, about really courageous people overcoming seemingly impossible odds and rising to love. Although I didn't grow up in that situation, I can understand that idea, and I think it's important that we all reach outside our own realms of experience and try to understand what people are going through and the things they have to overcome. It was really something I wanted to get involved with and support in any way I can.

Reception
On the film review aggregator site Rotten Tomatoes, the film received a 71% rating based on 14 reviews.

Metacritic gave the film a 62 out of 100 based on a normalized rating of 11 reviews, indicating "Generally favorable reviews."

Daniel M. Gold of The New York Times described the film as "a fascinating, valuable work of social, music and New York history, a celebration of a peaceful revolution by those who helped birth it."

References

External links 

Films set in the Bronx
Films set in the 1970s
Documentary films about New York City
Documentary films about gangs in the United States
2015 documentary films
American documentary films
Gangs in New York City
1970s in New York City
Documentary films about reconciliation
1970s in the Bronx
2010s English-language films
2010s American films